In floating-point arithmetic, the Sterbenz lemma or Sterbenz's lemma is a theorem giving conditions under which floating-point differences are computed exactly.
It is named after Pat H. Sterbenz, who published a variant of it in 1974.

The Sterbenz lemma applies to IEEE 754, the most widely used floating-point number system in computers.

Proof 
Let  be the radix of the floating-point system and  the precision.

Consider several easy cases first:

 If  is zero then , and if  is zero then , so the result is trivial because floating-point negation is always exact.

 If  the result is zero and thus exact.

 If  then we must also have  so .

For the rest of the proof, assume  without loss of generality.

Write  in terms of their positive integral significands  and minimal exponents :

Note that  and  may be subnormal—we do not assume .

The subtraction gives:

Let .
Since  we have:

 , so .

Further, since , we have , so that

which implies that

Hence

so  is a floating-point number.

In floating-point number systems without subnormal numbers, such as CPUs in nonstandard flush-to-zero mode instead of the standard gradual underflow, the Sterbenz lemma does not apply.

Relation to catastrophic cancellation 
The Sterbenz lemma may be contrasted with the phenomenon of catastrophic cancellation:
In other words, the Sterbenz lemma shows that subtracting nearby floating-point numbers is exact, but if the numbers you have are approximations then even their exact difference may be far off from the difference of numbers you wanted to subtract.

Use in numerical analysis 
The Sterbenz lemma is instrumental in proving theorems on error bounds in numerical analysis of floating-point algorithms.
For example, Heron's formula

can be proven, with the help of the Sterbenz lemma, to have low forward error for all inputs.

References 

Computer arithmetic
Floating point
Numerical analysis